Stephen Dedalus is James Joyce's literary alter ego, appearing as the protagonist and antihero of his first, semi-autobiographic novel of artistic existence A Portrait of the Artist as a Young Man (1916) and an important character in Joyce's 1922 novel Ulysses.

In Stephen Hero, an early version of what became Portrait, Stephen's surname is spelled "Daedalus" in more precise allusion to Daedalus, the architect in Greek myth who was contracted by King Minos to build the Labyrinth in which he would imprison his wife's son the Minotaur. Buck Mulligan makes reference to the mythic namesake in Ulysses, telling Stephen, "Your absurd name, an ancient Greek!" In revising the mammoth Stephen Hero into the considerably more compact Portrait of the Artist as a Young Man, Joyce shortened the name to "Dedalus".

Fictional biography
Stephen Dedalus appears in Ulysses as the character who corresponds to Telemachus; less overtly, he embodies aspects of Hamlet. He is the protagonist of the first three chapters. Subsequently, Leopold Bloom is introduced, and Stephen's interactions with Bloom and his wife, Molly Bloom, form much of the final chapters' substance. Mirroring his mythological namesake, Daedalus (or Daidalos in the Greek pronunciation and transliteration), whom Ovid described in the Metamorphoses (VIII:183–235) as being shut up in a tower to prevent his knowledge of the labyrinth from spreading to the public, Stephen is introduced taking breakfast in the Sandycove Martello tower in Dublin on the morning of 16 June 1904. Stephen shares his opinions about religion, especially as they relate to the recent death of his mother, with his quasi-friend Buck Mulligan, who manages to offend Stephen before making plans to go drinking later that evening as they part ways. In the second chapter Stephen teaches a class of boys a history lesson on ancient Rome. In the "Proteus" chapter (in Greek myth Proteus was the old man of the sea and the shepherd of sea animals who knew all things past, present, and future but disliked telling what he knew), Stephen ambles along the strand as his thoughts are related in the form of an internal monologue. Following several chapters concerning Bloom, Stephen returns to the fore of the novel in the library episode, in which he expounds at length to some acquaintances his theory of the obscurely autobiographical nature of Shakespeare's works and questions the institution of fatherhood, deeming it to be a fiction. He discredits his own ideas afterward, suggesting some lack of self-confidence.

As a character, Stephen seems to mirror many facets of Joyce's own life and personality. Joyce was a talented singer, and Bloom notes the excellence of Stephen's tenor voice after hearing him sing Johannes Jeep's song "Von der Sirenen Listigkeit". Stephen's first name remembers the first Christian martyr; in juxtaposition, his surname recalls the mythological figure Daedalus, a brilliant artificer who constructed a pair of wings for himself and his son Icarus as a means of escaping the island of Crete, where they had been imprisoned by King Minos. It is possible that Stephen's surname also reflects the labyrinthine quality of Stephen's developmental journey in Portrait of the Artist as a Young Man.

The name "Dedalus" also suggests Stephen's desire to "fly" above the constraints of religion, nationality, and politics in his own development.

Quotations 

When the soul of a man is born in this country there are nets flung at it to hold it back from flight. You talk to me of nationality, language, religion. I shall try to fly by those nets.

—A Portrait of the Artist as a Young Man, Chapter 5

A man of genius makes no mistakes. His errors are volitional and are the portals of discovery.

—Ulysses, Episode 9

Welcome, O life, I go to encounter for the millionth time the reality of experience and to forge in the smithy of my soul the uncreated conscience of my race. Old father, old artificer, stand me now and ever in good stead.

—A Portrait of the Artist as a Young Man

History is a nightmare from which I am trying to awake.

—Ulysses, Episode 2

I fear those big words that make us so unhappy.

—Ulysses, Episode 2

Notes

Ulysses (novel) characters
Fictional writers
Fictional Irish people
Literary characters introduced in 1918
Characters in novels of the 20th century
Author surrogates
Male characters in literature